Dankotuwa is a small town situated in Puttalam District,  North Western Province, Sri Lanka. 
Dankotuwa is a junction town, connecting Colombo - Negombo - Kuliyapitiya main road and Negombo - Kurunegala main road.

References 

Populated places in North Western Province, Sri Lanka